TVA Credit Union Ballpark is a stadium in Johnson City, Tennessee.  It is primarily used for baseball, and is the home field of Johnson City Doughboys in the summer collegiate Appalachian League. It was previously home to the Johnson City Cardinals Minor League Baseball team of the Appalachian League. The field is named "Howard Johnson Field", after a local Johnson City recreation official.  It was built in 1956 and holds 3,800 people.

References

External links
TVA Credit Union Ballpark Views - Ball Parks of the Minor Leagues
TVA Credit Union Ballpark Review and Photos - BallparkReviews.com

College baseball venues in the United States
Minor league baseball venues
Baseball venues in Tennessee
Johnson City, Tennessee
East Tennessee State Buccaneers baseball
1956 establishments in Tennessee
Sports venues completed in 1956
Soccer venues in Tennessee